Santander Cycles MK is a bicycle hire scheme based in Milton Keynes, United Kingdom. The scheme is operated by nextbike and sponsored by Santander UK. 
The scheme launched on 17 June 2016.

History
After the success of bicycle hire schemes in Belfast, Bath and Glasgow, nextbike announced plans  to partner with Santander UK on a new bicycle hire scheme in Milton Keynes, to be known as Santander Cycles MK. The scheme was a collaboration between Santander UK, Milton Keynes Council (MKC) and Milton Keynes City Centre Management. 
The scheme launched on 17 June 2016 with 300 bikes across 42 docking stations in Milton Keynes. Santander UK ambassador Jenson Button is the face of the bicycle hire scheme. 
nextbike is a German company that develops and operates public bike sharing systems with a number of successful bike sharing schemes.

The cycle scheme is not to be confused with Santander Cycles which is run by Transport for London and only caters to the London Area.

Operations and Services
Users first need to register for the bicycle hire scheme via the Santander Cycles MK website, the Santander Cycles MK app on the app or Google Play store or by calling 020 8166 9851.

Prices
Users have a choice of two tariffs – ‘pay as you ride’ or an annual subscription .  Users who register for the annual subscription for £60, with the first 30 minutes of every ride free, then it’s 50p for every additional 30 minutes. The scheme is also open to casual users  through the ‘pay as you ride’ fare with each rental costing £1.00 per 30 minutes up to a maximum of £10 in any 24 hour period.

Coverage Area
The coverage zone spans the central, leisure and residential areas of Milton Keynes, with cyclists able to make use of the 169.3mile ‘Redway’ network to avoid roads on most journeys.

Notes and references

External links 

 
 Map of docking stations on OneMK
 nextbike

Community bicycle programs
Milton Keynes
Bicycle sharing in the United Kingdom